André Henri Lavrillier (May 7, 1885- January 28, 1958) was a French medalist. He won the Prix de Rome for engraving in 1914. André Lavrillier studied at the Beaux-Arts de Paris in the workshops of Jules Chaplain (1839-1909), Frédéric de Vernon (1858-1912) and Auguste Patey (1855-1930). André Lavrillier won a Second Grand Prix de Rome in 1911, and a Premier Grand Prix de Rome in 1914. He married the Romanian sculptor Margaret Cossaceanu (1893-1980). They are the parents of photographer Carol-Marc Lavrillier (born in 1933). 

André Lavrillier is the designer of numerous French medals and coins including a pattern 1933 penny of which only four are known. The most recent sale of a Lavrillier pattern 1933 penny realised £72,000 at Baldwin's Auction House in London in 2016. He is the older brother of Gaston Lavrillier.

References 

1885 births
1958 deaths
French medallists
20th-century French sculptors
Prix de Rome for engraving